Regina Vandysheva (born October 31, 1992) is a Kazakhstani model and beauty pageant titleholder who was crowned Miss Kazakhstan 2014 and represented her country at Miss World 2015 pageants.

Personal life
Currently, Regina is being an Athlete as her professional career. In 2014, Regina was crowned as Miss Almaty 2014. Together at the event the reigning Miss Kazakhstan 2013, Aiday Isaeva gave a crown to Regina. Automatically she competed at Miss Kazakhstan 2014 National contest.

Miss Kazakhstan 2014
On 28 November 2014, Regina was crowned as Miss Kazakhstan 2014.

Miss World 2015
According to the official website of Miss Kazakhstan Organization, Regina joined at Miss World 2015 pageant and placed Top 20.

References

External links
Official Miss Kazakhstan website

1992 births
Living people
Miss World 2015 delegates
Kazakhstani beauty pageant winners
People from Almaty
Miss Kazakhstan winners
Kazakhstani people of Russian descent